The Remington 1911 R1 is a semi-automatic pistol modeled after the classic Colt 1911 which has served the US armed forces for over 100 years. Like the Colt 1911, the Remington 1911 is single action only, and has a grip safety and a manually operated thumb safety; it also has a Colt Series 80 style firing pin safety.

History
In 1918, Remington Arms produced a 1911 style pistol modeled after the Colt 1911 after receiving a contract from the US government to produce the pistols. The war came to an end only one year later and Remington shut down their production of the 1911 in 1919 until April 2010 when they announced that they would start producing the 1911 again. This time the pistol would be marketed as the Remington 1911 R1. This reemergence into the handgun market was the first time in 12 years that Remington had produced a handgun as their last handgun, the Remington XP-100, had ceased production in 1998.

Variants

Model 1911 R1 Carry
Differing from the rest of the R1 lineup with their cast frames, the Carry models feature a fully de-horned forged carbon steel slide and frame along with Novak branded rear sight, Trijicon front sight, 25-LPI front strap and mainspring housing checkering, match grade stainless barrel with target crown, ambi safety, beavertail grip safety also with 25-LPI checkered memory bump, skeletonized aluminum match trigger, lowered and flared ejection port, enhanced hammer and cocobolo grips. The gun is currently offered in a 5-inch Government model and -inch Commander model, both chambered in .45 ACP and an MSRP of $1067.00 as of early 2018.

Model 1911 R1 Centennial
Features include a brass bead in the front sight, custom grips with a Remington medallion and a special 100-year anniversary engraving marking the 100 year anniversary of the 1911 pistol.

Model 1911 R1 Centennial Limited Edition
Features an anniversary engraving made with 24-kt gold banner on the slide. Also features a carbona blue finish and a 14-kt gold bead in the front sight.

Model 1911 R1 Enhanced
Features enhanced hammer and trigger, extended magazine release button, wider thumb safety as well as custom grips with thumb grooves. The sights are adjustable in the rear and have a red fiber-optic in front. It comes with two bumper-padded magazines, each with 8 round capacity.

Model 1911 R1 Enhanced Threaded Barrel
Same as the Enhanced but with a threaded barrel allowing for the attaching of a suppressor. Also has a taller front and rear sight for shooting with a suppressor.

Model 1911 R1 Stainless
Identical to the original except with a matte stainless steel frame, slide, and various small parts.

External links

References

.45 ACP semi-automatic pistols
1911 platform
Remington Arms firearms
Semi-automatic pistols of the United States